Toch may refer to:

 Toc H, a charitable Christian service club

People
 Ernst Toch (1887–1964), a Jewish Austrian composer of Czech descent
 Hans Toch (1930–2021), Austrian-US social psychologist and criminologist
 Joanna Toch (born 1961), British rower and barrister
 Maximilian Toch (1864–1946), American chemist

See also 
 Totj, an Australian ethnic group

Jewish surnames